Fenouilia kreitneri is a species of small freshwater snail with gills and an operculum, aquatic gastropod mollusk in the family Pomatiopsidae.

Distribution
This species is endemic to Erhai Lake, Yunnan Province, China.

References

Pomatiopsidae
Endemic fauna of Yunnan
Invertebrates of China
Gastropods described in 1880
Taxonomy articles created by Polbot